Thomas Hall, built in 1905, is a historic building located in Murphree Area on the campus of the University of Florida in Gainesville, Florida, United States.  The building is named for William Reuben Thomas, the Gainesville mayor and businessman responsible for bringing the University of Florida to Gainesville.

Architect William Augustus Edwards designed Thomas Hall in the Collegiate Gothic style. Buckman Hall  was built at the same time and the two are the oldest buildings on the campus. On October 1, 1974, Thomas Hall was added to the U.S. National Register of Historic Places. Thomas Hall has been used as a dormitory for many years.

See also
University of Florida
Buildings at the University of Florida
University of Florida student housing
Campus Historic District

References

External links
 Alachua County listings at National Register of Historic Places
 Alachua County listings at Florida's Office of Cultural and Historical Programs
 Virtual tour of University of Florida Campus Historic District at Alachua County's Department of Growth Management
 The University of Florida Historic Campus at UF Facilities Planning & Construction
 George A. Smathers Libraries
 UF Builds: The Architecture of the University of Florida
 Thomas Hall

National Register of Historic Places in Gainesville, Florida
Buildings at the University of Florida
William Augustus Edwards buildings
University and college buildings on the National Register of Historic Places in Florida
University and college buildings completed in 1905
1905 establishments in Florida